Josephine is a city in Collin and Hunt counties in the U.S. state of Texas. Its population was 812 at the 2010 census, with 755 residents in Collin County and 57 in Hunt County. By 2020, its population increased to 2,119.

Geography

Josephine is located in southeastern Collin County at  (33.061018, –96.313227). A small portion extends east into Hunt County.

Demographics

As of the 2020 United States census, there were 2,119 people, 563 households, and 398 families residing in the city. As of the census of 2000, 594 people, 205 households, and 166 families were residing in the city. The population density was 364.5 people per square mile (140.7/km2). The 220 housing units averaged 135.0 per square mile (52.1/km2).

In 2000, the racial makeup of the city was 92.93% White, 1.18% African American, 0.51% Native American, 0.17% Asian, 0.51% Pacific Islander, 4.21% from other races, and 0.51% from two or more races. Hispanics or Latinos of any race were 10.61% of the population. By 2020, the racial makeup of the city was 65.6% non-Hispanic white, 5.9% Black or African American, 0.33% Native American, 1.04% Asian, 0.09% Pacific Islander, 0.52% some other race, 5.52% multiracial, and 21.0% Hispanic or Latino of any race.

Of the 205 households in 2000, 45.4% had children under the age of 18 living with them, 66.3% were married couples living together, 9.3% had a female householder with no husband present, and 19.0% were not families. About 15.1% of all households were made up of individuals, and 4.9% had someone living alone who was 65 years of age or older. The average household size was 2.90, and the average family size was 3.22. In the city, the population  distribution was 29.1% under the age of 18, 9.8% from 18 to 24, 29.3% from 25 to 44, 24.4% from 45 to 64, and 7.4% who were 65 years of age or older. The median age was 36 years. For every 100 females, there were 111.4 males. For every 100 females age 18 and over, there were 106.4 males.

As of 2000, the median income for a household in the city was $34,750, and for a family was $41,250. Males had a median income of $30,625 versus $23,333 for females. The per capita income for the city was $15,879. About 11.1% of families and 12.2% of the population were below the poverty line, including 16.6% of those under age 18 and 4.2% of those age 65 or over.

Education
Josephine is served by the Community Independent School District.

References

External links
City of Josephine official website

Dallas–Fort Worth metroplex
Cities in Texas
Cities in Collin County, Texas
Cities in Hunt County, Texas